G. Ramakrishnan is an Indian politician. He is a Politburo member, Central Committee Member and the ex-state secretary of Tamil Nadu State Committee of Communist Party of India (Marxist).

Early life and education
His native of Villupuram district, is a member of the CPI(M) central committee and Tamil Nadu State Secretariat.

He is a lawyer by training, he joined the party in 1969, actively working for the Students Federation of India (SFI). He practiced for eight years as a lawyer in Cuddalore before becoming a full-time party member in 1981. He has been active in its various organizations including the DYFI and CITU.

At the Coimbatore All India Conference, he was elected to the State Secretariat in 1989 and the Central Committee in 2008.

References 

Communist Party of India (Marxist) politicians from Tamil Nadu
20th-century births
Living people
Year of birth missing (living people)
People from Viluppuram district